Astro Blaster is a space-themed fixed shooter released in arcades by Sega in 1981. It was designed and programmed by Gary Shannon and Barbara Michalec. The game uses speech synthesis and during attract mode a voice says "Fighter pilots needed in sector wars...play Astro Blaster!" It is the first video game to have a copyright registered in Japan.

Gameplay

The player controls a ship which can fire and move left or right. The player must continuously monitor the onscreen temperature and fuel gauges. If the ship's laser overheats, it is disabled until it cools; and if fuel is depleted, the game ends regardless of how many lives the player has left. The player must battle through waves of enemies, which attack with varied formations and flight patterns. When a wave is destroyed, a new one appears. The  Warp function is usable once per sector or life, temporarily slowing all enemy vessels and making them easier to shoot.

At the end of each sector, the player flies through an asteroid belt and can obtain extra fuel by shooting fireballs. Then the mother ship is met, where the player docks and refuels for the next sector.

The player is rewarded for completing each of 25 undisclosed tasks or "secret bonuses", such as shooting all enemies in a specific order or shooting all enemies without missing.

Reception

Legacy
The 1981 Apple II game Threshold was inspired by seeing an Astro Blaster machine.

An Astro Blaster cabinet can be seen in Shenmue.

Astro Blaster is one of five unlockable games in the PlayStation Portable version of Sega Genesis Collection.

The  world record high score was set in 1982 and is held by Gus Pappas with 299,100 points.

References

External links

Astro Blaster at Arcade History
Score rankings at Twin Galaxies

1981 video games
Arcade video games
Arcade-only video games
Fixed shooters
Sega arcade games
Gremlin Industries games
Video games developed in the United States